The 2014 FIBA U16 European Championship Division B was the 11th edition of the Division B of the European basketball championship for men's national under-16 teams. It was played from 20 to 30 August 2014 in Strumica, Republic of Macedonia. Montenegro men's national under-16 basketball team won the tournament.

Participating teams

  (14th place, 2013 FIBA Europe Under-16 Championship Division A)

  (15th place, 2013 FIBA Europe Under-16 Championship Division A)

  (16th place, 2013 FIBA Europe Under-16 Championship Division A)

First round
In the first round, the teams were drawn into four groups. The first two teams from each group advance to the quarterfinal groups; the third and fourth teams advance to the 9th–16th place classification; the other teams will play in the 17th–22nd place classification groups.

Group A

Group B

Group C

Group D

17th–22nd place classification

Group I

Group J

17th–22nd place playoffs

21st place match

19st place match

17st place match

9th–16th place classification

Group G

Group H

13th–16th place playoffs

13th–16th place semifinals

15th place match

13th place match

9th–12th place playoffs

9th–12th place semifinals

11th place match

9th place match

1st–8th place classification

Group E

Group F

5th–8th place playoffs

5th–8th place semifinals

7th place match

5th place match

Championship playoffs

Semifinals

3rd place match

Final

Final standings

See also
2014 FIBA Europe Under-16 Championship (Division A)

References

FIBA U16 European Championship Division B
FIBA Europe Under-16 Championship Division B
2014–15 in Republic of Macedonia basketball
International youth basketball competitions hosted by North Macedonia
Sport in Strumica
August 2014 sports events in Europe
FIBA Europe U-16 Championship Division B
FIBA U16